West Creek may refer to the following locations:

Australia
West Creek, Victoria

United States
West Creek (New Jersey), a stream
West Creek (Pennsylvania), a stream
West Creek, New Jersey, a community
West Creek Township, Lake County, Indiana
West Creek High School, Clarksville, Tennessee
West Creek Natural Area, a protected area of Rocky Mountain National Park in Larimer County, Colorado